Peter Griffin is the main protagonist in the American animated television series Family Guy.

Peter Griffin may also refer to:

Peter A. Griffin (1937–1998), blackjack scholar and mathematician
Peter Griffin (singer) (1939–2007), German disco musician

See also
"Peter Griffin: Husband, Father... Brother?", the 14th episode of the third season of Family Guy